Tony McRae (born May 3, 1993) is an American football cornerback who is a free agent. He played college football at North Carolina A&T, and signed with the Oakland Raiders as an undrafted free agent in 2016.

Early life
McRae attended Scotland High School, in Laurinburg, North Carolina where he played varsity football and basketball. During his senior year, McRae helped lead the Fighting Scotts to a 14-0 undefeated season and the 2011 NCHSAA 4A State football championship. McRae's performance earned a place on the 2011 All-Cape Fear Regional Team as he was the leading rusher among NC state champion teams with 1,835 yards and 32 touchdowns.

College career
McRae accepted an athletic scholarship to attend North Carolina A&T State University, where he played for coach Rod Broadway's as a member of his first NC A&T Aggies football recruiting class.

2012 season

As a true freshman, McRae played in all 11 of the Aggie's games, and started in 3 of them. He would get his first start at cornerback to replace starting left cornerback Deji Olatoye who moved to free safety to replace of an injured Isaiah Martin. McRae would finish the 2012 season with a total of 23 tackles, 14 of them solo and 9 assisted; 4 broken up passes and 9 Kick returns.

2013 season

McRae began his sophomore with a 4 solo, 1 pass breakup and a 91 yard kickoff return for a touchdown in the season opener against Appalachian State. The Aggies would go on to upset Appalachian State 24-21, resulting in North Carolina A&T's first win over the mountaineers since 1993. Of the 11 games he played in that season, McRae would total 11 solo tackles, 1 assist, 2 pass breakups, 3 defended passes and 1 interception.

2014 season

For his Junior season McRae would start in all 12 games and opened the season with a 95 yard kickoff return for a touchdown against Alabama A&M in the 2014 MEAC/SWAC Challenge. Against Elon, McRae put up a career high 9 tackles and 5 defended passes. He ended the season with 62 total tackles, 46 of them being unassisted, 5 interceptions, 16 passes defended and 14 kickoffs returned for 360 total yards and 1 touchdown. McRae was ranked 13th in the nation in passes defended, 15th in interceptions and 4th in kickoff return touchdowns.

2015 season

Starting in all 12 games played, McRae has a season best performance against Delaware state in which he returned a kickoff for 75 yards for a touchdown, earned 6 tackles and 1 interception. He would finish the season leading the Aggies with 55 Tackles, 14 assists, 8 Pass defended, 22 kick returns for 622 yards and 2 touchdowns, and 3 interceptions. McRae's performance earned him first-team All MEAC and Boxtorow first-team All-American recognition.

College statistics

Professional career
According to ESPN, McRae was ranked the 85th best cornerback entering the 2016 NFL Draft.

Oakland Raiders
McRae was signed by the Oakland Raiders as an undrafted free agent on May 10, 2016. He was waived on May 16, 2016.

Cincinnati Bengals
On August 9, 2016, McRae signed with the Cincinnati Bengals. He was waived on September 3, 2016 and was signed to the practice squad the next day. He was released on September 16, 2016, but was later re-signed on November 29, 2016. He signed a reserve/future contract with the Bengals on January 2, 2017.

On September 2, 2017, McRae was waived by the Bengals.

Baltimore Ravens
On September 5, 2017, McRae was signed to the Baltimore Ravens' practice squad. He was promoted to the active roster on September 16, 2017. He was waived by the Ravens on October 21, 2017.

Buffalo Bills
On October 23, 2017, McRae was claimed off waivers by the Buffalo Bills, but was released two days later.

Cincinnati Bengals (second stint)
On October 27, 2017, McRae was signed to the Bengals' practice squad. He was promoted to the active roster on December 9, 2017.

Detroit Lions
On March 24, 2020, McRae signed with the Detroit Lions. He was placed on injured reserve on November 9, 2020.

References

External links
Baltimore Ravens bio
North Carolina A&T Aggies bio

1993 births
Living people
American football cornerbacks
Baltimore Ravens players
Buffalo Bills players
Cincinnati Bengals players
Detroit Lions players
North Carolina A&T Aggies football players
Oakland Raiders players
People from Laurinburg, North Carolina
Players of American football from North Carolina